Ashmanovo (Aşman) is a rural locality (a village) in Ishkarovsky Selsoviet, Ilishevsky District, Bashkortostan, Russia. The population was 15 as of 2010. There is 1 street.

Geography 
Ashmanovo is located 15 km east of Verkhneyarkeyevo (the district's administrative centre) by road. Nizhnecherekulevo is the nearest rural locality.

References 

Rural localities in Ilishevsky District